Senator Peterson may refer to:

Bob Peterson (Ohio politician) (born 1962), Ohio State Senate
Cary G. Peterson (born 1935), Utah State Senate
Collin Peterson (born 1944), Minnesota State Senate
Darin G. Peterson (born 1966), Utah State Senate
Darrel Peterson (1939–1994), Minnesota State Senate
David Peterson (Arizona politician) (born 1950), Arizona State Senate
Dutton S. Peterson (1894–1964), New York State Senate
Elmer Peterson (1892–?), Wisconsin State Senate
Harper Peterson (born 1948), North Carolina State Senate
Herbert Peterson (1876–?), Wisconsin State Senate
Hugh Peterson (1898–1961), Georgia State Senate
Jim Peterson (Montana politician) (born 1946), Montana State Senate
Jim Peterson (South Dakota politician) (born 1943), South Dakota Senate
John E. Peterson (born 1938), Pennsylvania State Senate
Joseph R. Peterson (1904–1967), Illinois State Senate
Karen Carter Peterson (born 1969), Louisiana State Senate
Karen E. Peterson, Delaware State Senate
Lowell Peterson (1921–1989), Washington State Senate
R. Ray Peterson (born 1959), Wyoming State Senate
William E. Peterson (born 1936), Illinois State Senate

See also
Senator Pederson (disambiguation)
Senator Petersen (disambiguation)